Bernard VII of Lippe (4 December 1428 – 2 April 1511) was the ruler of the Lordship of Lippe from 1429 until his death.  Because of the many bloody feuds in which he was involved, he was nicknamed "the Bellicose". He is the longest-ever ruling European nobleman.

Life 
He was the son of Lord Simon IV of Lippe and his wife, Margaret of Brunswick-Grubenhagen.  He inherited Lippe in 1429, before his first birthday.  He stood under the regency and guardianship of his uncle Otto.  After Otto died in 1446, his great-uncle Archbishop Dietrich II of Cologne was appointed regent.  Dietrich was represented in Lippe by his Amtmann, Johann Möllenbeck.

In 1444, Bernard VII concluded a treaty with Duke Adolph I of Cleves-Mark, in which he ceded to Adolph a 50% share in the city of Lippstadt, which had been mortgaged to Cleves.  At the same time, he joined an alliance, which made him a party in the so-called Feud of Soest against Archbishop Dietrich II of Cologne.  In 1447, Dietrich called in a Bohemian army, which devastated the countryside in Lippe and levelled the town of Blomberg to the ground.  The Bohemians also besieged the cities of Lippstadt and Soest, but were unsuccessful.

After the feud had been settled in 1449, Bernard took up residence at Blomberg Castle.  In 1468, he moved to Detmold, which at the time was the smallest city in Lippe, with only 350 inhabitants.  He expanded the Detmold Castle; an inscription in the old castle tower dated 1470 is a reminder of this.

Bernard was involved in a large number of feuds against various enemies, with shifting alliances.  In 1469, he supported Landgrave Louis II, Landgrave of Lower Hesse against his brother Henry III, Landgrave of Upper Hesse. On the other hand, in 1464, he supported his own brother, Prince-Bishop Simon III of Paderborn against Louis II of Lower Hesse when they fought the Hesse-Paderborn Feud about Calenberg Castle.

Marriage and issue 
From his marriage to Anna, the daughter of Count Otto II of Holstein-Schauenburg, he had the following children:

 Anna (b. ), married:
 Otto VI, Count of Hoya
 John II, Count of Nassau-Beilstein (d. 1513)
 Margaret (b. ), married to John I, Count of Rietberg
 Elisabeth (b. ), married:
 John II, Count of Spiegelberg
 Rudolf VII, Count of Diepholz
 Ermengarda ( – 24 August 1524), married Jobst I, Count of Hoya (1466–1507)
 Simon V of Lippe (1471–1536), married:
 Walburga of Bronkhorst
 Magdalene of Mansfeld-Mittelort
 Bernard
 Agnes

See also 

 List of longest-reigning monarchs

References 

 Philippine Charlotte Auguste Piderit: Die lippischen Edelherrn im Mittelalter, Detmold, 1876, p. 100 ff, Online

External links 
 Genealogy of Bernard VII

Lords of Lippe
House of Lippe
1428 births
1511 deaths
15th-century German people
15th-century rulers in Europe